Datebook was a teen-oriented magazine, edited and published in the US by
Art Unger

and Danny Fields

It is most famous for publishing the controversial "More popular than Jesus" interview with the Beatles in its September 1966 issue.

References

Teen magazines